Žagar is a Slovene and Croatian surname, an occupational surname, it is a Slavicized version of German Säger meaning sawyer. It is the 24th most popular surname in Slovenia, and is borne by 2,805 individuals. In Croatia, it is borne by 1,619 individuals, and it is traditionally found in Gorski Kotar and Međimurje, and was first mentioned in 1570 in Čabar, where it is also one of the most numerous surnames today. Ethnographically, it is autochthonously Carniolan. It may refer to:

Luka Žagar, Slovenian ice hockey player
Matej Žagar, Slovenian motorcycle rider
[[Teo Ž
agar]], Slovenian-American filmmaker
Tadej Žagar-Knez, Slovenian footballer

References

Sources

External links

Slovene-language surnames
Croatian surnames
Occupational surnames